Cilia and flagella associated protein 74 is a protein that in humans is encoded by the CFAP74 gene.

References

Further reading